DIPAMP is an organophosphorus compound that is used as a ligand in homogeneous catalysis.  It is a white solid that dissolves in organic solvents.  Work on this compound by W. S. Knowles was recognized with the Nobel Prize in Chemistry. DIPAMP was the basis for of the first industrial scale asymmetric hydrogenation, the synthesis of the drug L-DOPA.

DIPAMP is a C2-symmetric diphosphine. Each phosphorus centre, which is pyramidal, bears three different substituents - anisyl, phenyl, and the ethylene group. The ligand therefore exists as the enantiomeric (R,R) and (S,S) pair, as well as the achiral meso isomer.

DIPAMP was originally prepared by an oxidative coupling, starting from anisyl(phenyl)(methyl)phosphine.

References

Diphosphines
Hydrogenation catalysts
Phenyl compounds